Bradley State Scenic Viewpoint is a state park in the U.S. state of Oregon, administered by the Oregon Parks and Recreation Department.  It is located directly north of U.S. Route 30 between Astoria and Portland.

See also 
 List of Oregon state parks

References

External links

 

State parks of Oregon
Parks in Clatsop County, Oregon